Rothesay Park School is a middle school situated in Rothesay, New Brunswick, Canada. The school serves about 300 students in grades 6 to 8 in New Brunswick School District 06.

History
The school was founded in the late 19th century. It moved into a purpose brick built building, the first in the area, in 1915 when it was known as Rothesay Consolidated School and educated in grades 1–12. After the opening of a new high school in the 1950s it was renamed as Rothesay Elementary School and restricted to grades 1–6. However this school closed in 1975 and a new Rothesay Elementary School opened nearby. Community pressure resisted the demolition of the building which re-opened in 1977 as Rothesay Park Elementary School. A further reorganisation occurred in 1997 when it became a grade 6-8 middle school, now called Rothesay Park School.

Recognition
Heritage Canada recognized the re-opening project with a Regional Award of Honour for Heritage Preservation in 1997. During the 2005–2006 school year it was voted, by Today's Parent Magazine, one of the top 100 schools in Canada.

References

External links 
Rothesay Park School

Educational institutions established in 1997
Schools in Kings County, New Brunswick
Middle schools in New Brunswick
1997 establishments in New Brunswick